50 Number Ones is the sixth compilation album by American country music singer George Strait, released on October 5, 2004. It is a compilation of his first 50 number-one country music singles, starting with 1982's "Fool Hearted Memory" and presented in chronological order. A new track, "I Hate Everything", was also included and became his 51st overall number one in 2004. The figure of "50 Number Ones" includes not just songs that reached the top of the Billboard Hot Country Songs chart but also those that topped the Radio & Records and Gavin Report charts.

Commercial performance
The album was certified 7× Platinum by the RIAA on December 13, 2007 for 3.5 million copies shipped. It has sold 3,791,500 copies in the US as of April 2015, and 5,531,000 units including tracks and streams as of January 2020.

Track listing

Charts

Weekly charts

Year-end charts

References 

2004 compilation albums
George Strait compilation albums
MCA Records compilation albums
Compilation albums of number-one songs